Joseph J. "Sonny" Minnick (March 16, 1933 – October 12, 2015) was an American politician from Maryland and a member of the Democratic Party.

Background 
Minnick was born in Dundalk, Maryland on March 16, 1933. He served in the United States Navy during the Korean War. Upon arriving home, he joined his brother Dan Minnick Jr. to take over the management of Minnick's Hollywood Inn, a family business founded by his grandfather in the early 1920s, now known as Minnick's Restaurant and Catering Business, Inc. Minnick's bar was raided on June 29, 2011, which seized five video devices believed to be involved in illegal gambling . Minnick was not charged.

Minnick was active with both the Restaurant Association and with veteran's groups. Minnick was a strong supporter of small businesses in the State of Maryland. He died on October 12, 2015, from a blood disease.

In the Legislature 
He served five terms in the Maryland House of Delegates, representing Maryland's District 6 in Baltimore County. Minnick was a member of the Economic Matters Committee.

Legislative notes 
voted against the Clean Indoor Air Act of 2007 (HB359)
 voted against in-state tuition for illegal immigrants in 2007 -Higher Education -Tuition Charges -Maryland High School Students, 2007 (HB6)
voted for income tax reduction in 1998 (SB750)
 voted for the Maryland Gang Prosecution Act of 2007 (HB713), subjecting gang members to up to 20 years in prison and/or a fine of up to $100,000 
 voted for Jessica's Law (HB 930), eliminating parole for the most violent child sexual predators and creating a mandatory minimum sentence of 25 years in state prison, 2007 
 voted for Public Safety – Statewide DNA Database System – Crimes of Violence and Burglary – Post conviction (HB 370), helping to give police officers and prosecutors greater resources to solve crimes and eliminating a backlog of 24,000 unanalyzed DNA samples, leading to 192 arrests, 2008 
 voted for Vehicle Laws – Repeated Drunk and Drugged Driving Offenses – Suspension of License (HB 293), strengthening Maryland's drunk driving laws by imposing a mandatory one year license suspension for a person convicted of drunk driving more than once in five years, 2009 
 voted for HB 102, creating the House Emergency Medical Services System Workgroup, leading to Maryland's budgeting of $52 million to fund three new Medevac helicopters to replace the State's aging fleet, 2009 
 voted against Civil Marriage Protection Act (HB438) - civil marriage rights for same-sex couples, 2012 

For the past four years, Delegate Minnick has annually voted to support classroom teachers, public schools, police and hospitals in Baltimore County. Since 2002, funding to schools across the State has increased 82%, resulting in Maryland being ranked top in the nation for K-12 education.

Election results 

2002 Race for Maryland House of Delegates – District 6
Voters to choose three:
{| class="wikitable"
|-
!Name
!Votes
!Percent
!Outcome
|-
|- 
|John S. Arnick Dem.
|17,541
|  20.87%
|   Won
|-
|-
|Joseph J. Minnick, Dem.
|17,530
|  20.85%
|   Won
|-
|-
|Michael H. Weir, Jr., Dem.
|17,958
|  21.36%
|   Won
|-
|-
|Jane Brooks, Rep.
|12,517
|  14.89%
|   Lost
|-
|-
|Bruce Laing, Rep.
|9,448
|  11.24%
|   Lost
|-
|-
|Paul Michael Blitz, Rep.
|8,969
|  10.67%
|   Lost
|-
|Other Write-Ins
|106
|  0.13%
|   Lost
|-
|}

1998 Race for Maryland House of Delegates – District 7
Voters to choose three:
{| class="wikitable"
|-
!Name
!Votes
!Percent
!Outcome
|-
|- 
|Jacob J. Mohorovic Jr., Dem.
|16,338
|  23%
|   Won
|-
|-
|Joseph J. Minnick, Dem.
|15,095
|  21%
|   Won
|-
|-
|John S. Arnick, Dem.
|14,385
|  20%
|   Won
|-
|-
|Jane Brooks, Rep.
|9,792
|  14%
|   Lost
|-
|-
|Russell Mirabile, Rep.
|8,947
|  13%
|   Lost
|-
|-
|Gary Adams, Rep.
|6,178
|  9%
|   Lost
|-
|}

1994 Race for Maryland House of Delegates – District 7
Voters to choose three:
{| class="wikitable"
|-
!Name
!Votes
!Percent
!Outcome
|-
|- 
|Jacob J. Mohorovic Jr., Dem.
|16,059
|  25%
|   Won
|-
|-
|Joseph J. Minnick, Dem.
|15,880
|  25%
|   Won
|-
|-
|John S. Arnick, Dem.
|14,469
|  23%
|   Won
|-
|-
|Jacqueline W. Madison, Rep.
|9,149
|  14%
|   Lost
|-
|-
|Robert J. Parsons, Rep.
|7,628
|  12%
|   Lost
|-
|}

References 

1933 births
2015 deaths
21st-century American politicians
Democratic Party members of the Maryland House of Delegates
United States Navy sailors
United States Navy personnel of the Korean War
People from Dundalk, Maryland